Some People Can Do What They Like is the third solo album by Robert Palmer, released in 1976. It includes "Man Smart, Woman Smarter" which peaked at number 63 on the Billboard Pop Singles chart and number 46 in the UK in 1977. The album peaked at number 68 in the US. The album was dedicated to Mongezi Feza. The model on the front cover, engaging Palmer in a game of strip poker, is Playboy magazine's April 1976 Playmate of the Month, Denise Michele.

Track listing
"One Last Look" (Bill Payne, Fran Tate) – 4:22
"Keep in Touch" (Robert Palmer) – 3:25
"Man Smart (Woman Smarter)" (Norman Span aka King Radio) – 2:35
"Spanish Moon" (Lowell George) – 5:58
"Have Mercy" (Don Covay) – 3:50
"Gotta Get a Grip on You (Part II)" (Robert Palmer, Alan Powell) – 3:57
"What Can You Bring Me" (James Gadson) – 3:43
"Hard Head" (Eddie Curtis) – 4:30
"Off the Bone" (Phill Brown, Robert Palmer, Steve Smith) – 2:18
"Some People Can Do What They Like" (Robert Palmer) – 4:09

Charts

Personnel
Robert Palmer – vocals
Pierre Brock, Chuck Rainey – bass guitar
Richie Hayward, Jeff Porcaro,  Spider Webb, Robert Greenidge – drums
Chilli Charles – timbales
Sam Clayton – percussion, congas, background vocals
Jody Linscott – percussion, congas
Paul Barrere – guitar, background vocals
Freddie Harris, Carol Kaye, Freddy Wall – guitar
Bill Payne – keyboards, background vocals
James Allen Smith, William "Smitty" Smith – keyboards
Greg Carroll – harmonica
Arthur Smith – ocarina, whistle

Production
Producer – Steve Smith
Engineered & Mixed by Phill Brown at Clover Studios (Los Angeles, CA).
Assistant Engineer – Toby Scott
Additional Engineer on Tracks #2, 8 & 10 – Richard Digby Smith
Mastered by George Marino at Sterling Sound, NYC
Cover Photography – Moshe Brakha 
Design – Ria Lewerke
Management – Connie De Nave

See also
 List of albums released in 1976

References

Robert Palmer (singer) albums
1976 albums
Island Records albums
Albums produced by Robert Palmer (singer)